Bases Loaded 4, known in Japan as , is the fourth installment for the Bases Loaded series for the NES.

Summary
This video game was released in November 1991 in Japan and April 1993 in North America. The game is the fourth installment of the Bases Loaded series, and the last of the original NES series.

Ending
When the player completes the game in the US version, they are treated to a one-screen ending. In the Japanese version, the player is treated to a credits screen which reveals the faces of five of the game designers (two designers, one composer, one programmer, one planner), along with their quotations in Japanese (except sound composer Tatsuya Nishimura, whose quotation is in broken English).

References

External links

1991 video games
Bases Loaded video games
Jaleco games
Nintendo Entertainment System games
Nintendo Entertainment System-only games
Tose (company) games
Video game sequels
Multiplayer and single-player video games
Video games developed in Japan